Andrew or Andy Cole  may refer to:
Andy Cole, English footballer 
Andy the Kid (born 1984), Australian rock musician
Andrew Cole (musician) (born 1982), Canadian musician